Eagle Radio was a local radio station in the Surrey and North East Hampshire area of England. Based in Guildford in the Guildford College campus, Eagle Radio was part of the UKRD Group of radio stations.

Launch
Peter Gordon launched 96.4 The Eagle at 7:45am on 4 January 1996, with the words "Hey, I've landed", an allusion to "the Eagle has Landed", the call sign Neil Armstrong used for the landing of the 1969 lunar landing craft. The first song played was "Uptown Girl" by Billy Joel and the second song was "Dreams" by Fleetwood Mac.

History
The station changed its name from 96.4 The Eagle to 96.4 Eagle Radio in February 2007 and later changed to solely Eagle Radio. It launched on DAB Digital Radio on 12 December 2013.

Until 2018, Eagle Radio broadcast The Vodafone Big Top 40 chart show (previously The Pepsi Chart & Hit40UK) which was produced from Capital FM in London and syndicated across over 140 commercial radio stations in the UK. However, the show was withdrawn from syndication in 2018 and now broadcasts solely on Heart & Capital stations.

Closure
Eagle Radio was purchased by Bauer Media in 2019 along with other stations in the UKRD group. On 27 May 2020 it was announced that Eagle Radio will become Greatest Hits Radio from early September 2020. The station went through a transitional period where its playlist was changed over to the 70s, 80s and 90s era, and jingles changed to reflect the station playing "greatest hits". Eagle Radio was finally rebranded to Greatest Hits Radio at 6:00am on 1 September 2020.

Notable past presenters

 Neil Fox (Networked Chart Show)
 Mark Goodier (Networked Chart Show)
 Leona Graham

References

External links
 Greatest Hits Radio Surrey & East Hampshire

Radio stations established in 1996
Guildford
Radio stations in Surrey
Radio stations in Hampshire
Bauer Radio